FC Khimik Dzerzhinsk is an association football club from Dzerzhinsk, Russia, founded in 1946. It played in the Soviet First League and the FNL (second level) from 1947 to 1949, from 1960 to 1962 and from 2013–14 to 2014–15. It was dissolved after the 2015–16 season. Before the 2021–22 season, it was licensed for the FNL 2], the third tier of Russian football, once again.

Current squad
As of 22 February 2023, according to the Second League website.

Team name history
1946 FC Azot Dzerzhinsk
1947–1948 FC Khimik Dzerzhinsk
1949–1959 FC Zavod im. Sverdlova Dzerzhinsk
1960–1961 FC Zarya Dzerzhinsk
1962–1963 FC Volna Dzerzhinsk
1964–2000 FC Khimik Dzerzhinsk
2001–2002 FC Sibur-Khimik Dzerzhinsk
2003–2016 FC Khimik Dzerzhinsk

References

External links
 
Fan website

Association football clubs established in 1946
Football clubs in Russia
Sport in Nizhny Novgorod Oblast
1946 establishments in Russia